The Archdiocese of Lublin is an archdiocese located in the city of Lublin in Poland.

History
 1375: Established as Diocese of Chełm
 1790: Renamed as Diocese of Chełm and Lublin
 September 22, 1805: Renamed as Diocese of Lublin
 March 25, 1992: Promoted as Metropolitan Archdiocese of Lublin

Special churches

Minor Basilicas
 Bazylika pw. Narodzenia NMP, Chełm
 Bazylika pw. św. Stanisława BM (OO. Dominikanie), Lublin
 Bazylika św. Wojciecha (Sanktuarium Matki Bożej Kębelskiej), Wąwolnica

Leadership
 Bishops of Chełm (Roman rite)
 Bishop Jakub Uchański (18 November 1551 – 1561), appointed Bishop of Włocławek (Kujawy, Kalisze); future Archbishop
 Bishop Stanislaw Pstrokonski (1645–1657)
 Bishop Stanisław Dąmbski (1673–1676)
 Bishop Stanisław Jacek Święcicki (8 February 1677 – 1696)
 Bishop Mikołaj Michał Wyżycki (1699–1705)
 Bishop Kazimierz Łubieński (1705 – 10 May 1710)
 Bishop Teodor Wolff von Ludinghausen (10 November 1710 – 9 May 1712)
 Bishop Krzysztof Andrzej Jan Szembek (30 July 1711 – 15 March 1719)
 Bishop Alexander Antoni Pleszowice Fredro (1719–1724)
 Bishop Jan Feliks Szaniawski (29 January 1725 – 1733)
 Bishop Walenty Franciszek Wężyk (1753–1765)
 Bishop Feliks Paweł Turski (22 April 1765 – 4 March 1771)
 Bishop Jan Alojzy Aleksandrowicz (1780 – 12 September 1781)
 Bishops of Chełm and Lublin (Roman rite)
 Bishop Maciej Grzegorz Garnysz (1781 – 6 October 1790)
 Bishop Wojciech Skarszewski (1790 – 22 September 1805 see below)
 Bishops of Lublin (Roman rite)
 Bishop Wojciech Skarszewski (see above 22 September 1805 – 1824), appointed Archbishop of Warszawa {Warsaw}
 Bishop Valentino Baranowski (22 December 1871 – ?)
 Bishop Kazimierz Józef Wnorowski (15 March 1883 – ?)
 Bishop Francesco Jaczewski (30 December 1889 – 1918)
 Bishop Marian Leon Fulman (24 September 1918 – 18 December 1945)
 Bishop Stefan Wyszyński (4 March 1946 – 12 November 1948), appointed Archbishop of Gniezno and Warszawa {Warsaw}  (Cardinal in 1953)
 Bishop Piotr Kałwa (30 May 1949 – 17 July 1974)
 Bishop Bolesław Pylak (27 June 1975 – 25 March 1992 see below)
 Archbishops of Lublin (Roman rite)
 Archbishop Bolesław Pylak (see above 25 March 1992 – 14 June 1997)
 Archbishop Józef Mirosław Życiński (14 June 1997 – 10 February 2011)
 Archbishop Stanisław Budzik (26 September 2011 – )

Suffragan dioceses
 Sandomierz
 Siedlce

See also
Roman Catholicism in Poland
John Paul II Catholic University of Lublin

Sources
 GCatholic.org
 Catholic Hierarchy
  Diocese website

Roman Catholic dioceses in Poland
Religious organizations established in 1375
Lublin